Shoreline Entertainment is an independent film production company and international sales agency that was founded in 1992 by CEO and film producer Morris Ruskin.

Partial filmography 
Sir Billi
The American Side
7 Boxes
The Man from Elysian Fields
Lakeboat
Price of Glory
Marilyn Hotchkiss' Ballroom Dancing and Charm School
The Visit
The Signal
Undertow
Weirdsville
Everything's Gone Green
Geography Club
A Place in the Caribbean
An Innocent Kiss

References

External links

Film production companies of the United States
Entertainment companies established in 1992
Mass media companies established in 1992
International sales agents